Bharrah Union is a union of Nagarpur Upazila, Tangail District, Bangladesh. It is situated 8 km northwest of Nagarpur and 28 km south of Tangail city.

Demographics

According to Population Census 2011 performed by Bangladesh Bureau of Statistics, The total population of Bharra union is 30,743. There are 6,901 households in total.

Education

The literacy rate of Bharrah Union is 36.8% (Male-49%, Female-34.8%).
Arrah Government Primary School
Bharrah Umesh Chandra High School
Bharrah Primary School & Others!

See also
 Union Councils of Tangail District

References

Populated places in Dhaka Division
Populated places in Tangail District
Unions of Nagarpur Upazila